Woga is an album by American organist Charles Kynard which was recorded in 1972 (Los Angeles, CA) and released on the Mainstream label.

Reception

Allmusic awarded the album 4 stars.

Track listing 
All compositions by Richard Fritz except as indicated
 "Little Ghetto Boy" (Earl DuRouen, Edward Howard) - 3:04  
 "Hot Sauce" - 4:32  
 "Lime Twig" - 3:43  
 "Slop Jar" - 9:12  
 "Rock Steady" (Aretha Franklin) - 3:13  
 "Name the Missing Word" (Homer Banks, Bettye Crutcher, Raymond Jackson) - 3:21  
 "The First Time Ever (I Saw Your Face)" (Ewan MacColl) - 2:58  
 "Shout" - 6:15

Personnel 
Charles Kynard - organ
James Kartchner, Jerry Rusch - trumpet
George Bohanon, David Roberts - trombone
Arthur Adams - guitar
Chuck Rainey - electric bass
Paul Humphrey - drums
Richard Fritz - arranger, conductor

References 

Charles Kynard albums
1972 albums
Mainstream Records albums
Albums produced by Bob Shad